Sir Robert Yewdall Jennings (19 October 1913 – 4 August 2004) was Whewell Professor of International Law at Cambridge University from 1955 to 1982 and a Judge of the International Court of Justice from 1982. He also served as the President of the ICJ between 1991 and 1994 and resigned from the Court on 10 July 1995.

Birth and education
Jennings was born in Yorkshire, England where his father worked at a small manufacturing firm and his mother was a mill weaver.

Educated at the local village school, and later at Belle Vue Grammar School in Bradford, he went on to study history at Downing College, Cambridge. After he gained an upper first class degree, the award of a Squire Law scholarship and some assistance from his local authority provided the financial support that enabled him to proceed to study Law. Again, Jennings excelled, gaining first class honours in both parts of the Cambridge Law Tripos and in the postgraduate LLB degree, and being awarded the Whewell and Cassell scholarships. He later got his LL.B from the same institution and then won the Joseph Hodges Choate Memorial Fellowship to Harvard University.

Career
After Harvard, Jennings worked at an assistant lectureship at the London School of Economics. From 1939 on, he was a Fellow of Jesus College, Cambridge, and was awarded the Hudson Medal of the American Society of International Law. The University of Leicester named a chair after him; Malcolm Shaw held the Chair until 2011. Katja Ziegler is the current Sir Robert Jennings Professor of International Law. In 1955 he succeeded Sir Hersch Lauterpacht as Whewell Professor of International Law, the post which he held until 1982.

He served in the Intelligence Corps during the Second World War.

He was knighted in 1982. He was a president of the Institut de droit international, received honorary doctorates from the universities of Hull, Leicester and the Saarland, as well as Oxford and Cambridge.

He was an editor of the British Yearbook of International Law; co-authored (with Sir Arthur Watts) 9th edition of Oppenheim's International Law. His other important publications include The Acquisition of Territory in International Law.

Personal life
He married Christine Bennett (died 2022); they had one son and two daughters.

See also
 Judges of the International Court of Justice
 Whewell Professorship of International Law

References

External links 

 
 

International law scholars
1913 births
2004 deaths
Harvard University alumni
Members of the Institut de Droit International
Presidents of the International Court of Justice
20th-century English judges
Knights Bachelor
Lawyers awarded knighthoods
Fellows of Jesus College, Cambridge
Alumni of Downing College, Cambridge
Whewell Professors of International Law
People educated at Belle Vue Boys' Grammar School, Bradford
British judges of United Nations courts and tribunals